Nikkan Kogyo Shimbun (日刊工業新聞, The Daily Industrial News), one of the leading daily newspapers in Japan, specializes in business and industrial affairs, and is published by The Nikkan Kogyo Shimbun, Ltd. (Head Office: Tokyo, Japan). Circulation is around 420,000. The newspaper was inaugurated in 1915. It covers economic and industrial affairs in general, and affairs of specific industries such as automobile, electronics, telecommunication, information technologies, science, etc.

Apart from publishing newspapers, the company publishes numerous books and free papers (namely Metro-Guide), and organizes trade fairs (Automotive Parts Product Solution Fair / International Robot Exhibition / Pan-Exhibition for Wash and Clean etc.) and seminars. Among them, collaboration with United Nations Industrial Development Organization (UNIDO) is a notable achievement. The two agencies jointly organized a seminar in June 2006, 2007 and 2008, namely "Global Auto Parts Business Seminar", for the purpose of further enhancing Japanese investment (especially auto-parts sector) at newly industrial states.

The newspaper concluded an alliance with Asahi Shimbun and Jiji Press in February 2008. Three companies start a new service on information search by internet from April 2008. Japanese name is "KIJISAKU". More than eight million articles and information of three media agencies are put in this service.

Further reading

External links
 Nikkan Kogyo Shimbun (in English)
Nikkan Kogyo Shimbun Business Line (in Japanese)
  Media Data of Nikkan Kogyo Shimbun (in English)
"Global Auto Parts Business Seminar" in June 2006 (in English)
Information Search Service "KIJISAKU" (Japanese only)

Daily newspapers published in Japan
Business newspapers
Newspapers published in Tokyo
1915 establishments in Japan
Publications established in 1915